Saddam Hossain or Mohammad Noor Alam Saddam Hossain (born 3 October 1995) is a Bangladeshi cricketer. He made his first-class debut for Rangpur Division in the 2016–17 National Cricket League on 23 December 2016.

References

External links
 

1995 births
Living people
Bangladeshi cricketers
Brothers Union cricketers
Rangpur Division cricketers
Place of birth missing (living people)
Khulna Tigers cricketers